Supiori may refer to:
 Supiori Island
 Supiori Regency